The Pacific Hardware & Steel Company Warehouse is an industrial building located in Northwest Portland, Oregon designed by prominent architect John Virginius Bennes. The building is registered on the National Register for Historic Places.

See also
 National Register of Historic Places listings in Northwest Portland, Oregon

References

1911 establishments in Oregon
Buildings and structures in Portland, Oregon
Industrial buildings completed in 1911
Industrial buildings and structures on the National Register of Historic Places in Portland, Oregon